Hussein Ali Zein (born 27 January 1995) is a Lebanese footballer who plays as a right-back for  club Ahed and the Lebanon national team.

International career 

Zein played for the national under-19 team between 2013 and 2014. He also represented the under-23 team between 2015 and 2017, playing six times.

Zein made his debut for the senior team on 5 February 2016, in a 2–0 defeat against Bahrain in a friendly game. He also participated at the 2019 WAFF Championship in Iraq.

Career statistics

International

Honours
Ahed
 AFC Cup: 2019
 Lebanese Premier League: 2014–15, 2016–17, 2017–18, 2018–19, 2021–22
 Lebanese FA Cup: 2017–18, 2018–19
 Lebanese Elite Cup: 2013, 2015, 2022; runner-up: 2021
 Lebanese Super Cup: 2015, 2017, 2018, 2019

Individual
 Lebanese Premier League Team of the Season: 2014–15, 2017–18, 2018–19

References

External links

 
 
 
 
 

1995 births
Living people
Lebanese footballers
Lebanon international footballers
Association football fullbacks
Lebanese Premier League players
Al Ahed FC players
People from Sidon
Lebanon youth international footballers
AFC Cup winning players